Villanovaforru, Biddanoa de Forru in Sardinian, is a comune (municipality) in the Province of South Sardinia in the Italian region Sardinia, located about  northwest of Cagliari and about  northwest of Sanluri.

Villanovaforru borders the following municipalities: Collinas, Lunamatrona, Sanluri, Sardara.

Demographic evolution

References

Cities and towns in Sardinia